Anand Shetty (c. 1961 – 21 May 2013) was an Indian athlete who specialized in sprints. He was a nine-time national champion in the 100 metres and 200 metres events between 1982 and 1989.

Career
Anand Shetty started his career in sports initially as a Kabaddi player and eventually turned into sprints. He made his first senior appearance at the international level in the 1982 Asian Games in New Delhi. In the South Asian Games, he won gold medals in the 200 metres event in Kathmandu in 1984 and in the 100 metres event in Calcutta in 1987. He won gold medals in the 100 metres and 200 metres seniors' national events in 1982 in Delhi and went on to retain the titles in Jamshedpur in 1983. In total, he held the records nine times till 1989. He was given the Rajyotsava award in 1991 for his contribution to sports.

Death 
Anand Shetty was seriously injured in a car accident on 18 May 2013 and succumbed to the injuries on 21 May at the KMC Hospital in Mangalore.

References

External links
 Record holders in senior national championships

Athletes from Karnataka
People from Dakshina Kannada district
Indian male sprinters
Road incident deaths in India
Year of birth missing
Date of birth missing
2013 deaths
South Asian Games gold medalists for India
South Asian Games medalists in athletics